The  is a limited express train service operated by the West Japan Railway Company (JR West) between  and  in Japan since 12 March 2011. It replaced the previous Kitakinki services.

The name means "stork", and was chosen because the stork is the prefectural bird of Hyōgo, and the city of Toyooka in particular has close involvement with stork breeding programmes.

Service pattern and station stops

14 down services (Kounotori 1–27) from Shin-Osaka and 13 up services (Kounotori 2–26) to Shin-Osaka run daily, with the journey time from Shin-Osaka to Kinosaki Onsen taking approximately 2 hours 45 minutes.

Kounotori services stop at the following stations. (Stations in parentheses are not served by all trains.)

 -  -  -  -  - - -  - -  - -  - - - - -

Rolling stock
The following rolling stock is used on Kounotori services.
 287 series EMUs (since 12 March 2011)
 289 series EMUs (from 31 October 2015)

289 series EMUs converted from former dual-voltage 683 series trainsets were introduced on Kounotori services from 31 October 2015, replacing the remaining JNR-era 381 series trains.

Former rolling stock
 183 series 4/6-car EMUs (12 March 2011 – 15 March 2013)
 381 series 4/6-car EMUs (from 12 March 2011 to 31 May 2011, and from 1 June 2012 to 30 October 2015)

See also
 List of named passenger trains of Japan

References

External links

 JR West 287 series Kounotori 
 JR West 289 series Kounotori 

Named passenger trains of Japan
West Japan Railway Company
Railway services introduced in 2011
2011 establishments in Japan